On 15 September 2014, a ship sank off the Libya coast with up to 250 refugees on board. More than 200 people are believed to have drowned. 36 people have been rescued and were taken to a hospital.

See also
 Timeline of the European migrant crisis
 Ghost boat investigation

References

Migrant shipwreck
Migrant shipwreck
Maritime incidents in Libya
Transport disasters involving refugees of the Arab Winter (2011–present)

Migrant boat disasters in the Mediterranean Sea